The Pearls of Lady Harrison (German:Die Perlen der Lady Harrison) is a 1922 German silent film directed by Heinz Herald and starring Heinrich George.

References

Bibliography
 Hans-Michael Bock and Tim Bergfelder. The Concise Cinegraph: An Encyclopedia of German Cinema. Berghahn Books.

External links

1922 films
Films of the Weimar Republic
Films directed by Heinz Herald
German silent feature films
German black-and-white films